The Snaith School is a coeducational secondary school with academy status, located in Snaith in the East Riding of Yorkshire, England. The school was founded in 1899. As of 2014 the school had a pupil count of 910. Also as of the 2014 ofsted report the school was rated: Good. the Percentage of pupils who attained five GCSEs grade A* to C including English and mathematics in 2014 was 66%.

References

External links

Secondary schools in the East Riding of Yorkshire
Academies in the East Riding of Yorkshire
Educational institutions established in 1899
Snaith
1899 establishments in England